Carex canescens L. (syn. C. cinerea Poll.; C. curta Gooden.) is a perennial species of plants in the family Cyperaceae growing in damp forests and wetlands. It is widespread across much of Europe, Asia, Australia, New Guinea, North America, Greenland and southern South America.

Subspecies
Carex canescens subsp. canescens – Europe, Asia, Australia, North America, New Guinea
Carex canescens subsp. disjuncta (Fernald) Toivonen – eastern Canada, eastern United States
Carex canescens var. robustior Blytt ex Andersson – Argentina, Chile, Falkland Islands

References

External links
 Jepson Manual treatment - CAREX canescens

canescens
Flora of North America
Flora of South America
Flora of Europe
Flora of Asia
Flora of Australia
Flora of New Guinea
Plants described in 1753
Taxa named by Carl Linnaeus
Flora of Greenland